The third cabinet of Iuliu Maniu was the government of Romania from 20 October 1932 to 13 January 1933.

Ministers
The ministers of the cabinet were as follows:

President of the Council of Ministers:
Iuliu Maniu (20 October 1932 - 13 January 1933)
Vice President of the Council of Ministers: 
Gheorghe Mironescu (20 October 1932 - 13 January 1933)
Minister of the Interior: 
Ion Mihalache (20 October 1932 - 13 January 1933)
Minister of Foreign Affairs: 
Nicolae Titulescu (20 October 1932 - 13 January 1933)
Minister of Finance:
Virgil Madgearu (20 October 1932 - 13 January 1933)
Minister of Justice:
Mihai Popovici (20 October 1932 - 13 January 1933)
Minister of Public Instruction, Religious Affairs and the Arts:
Dimitrie Gusti (20 October 1932 - 13 January 1933)
Minister of National Defence:
Gen. Nicolae Samsonovici (20 October 1932 - 13 January 1933)
Minister of Agriculture and Property:
Voicu Nițescu (20 October 1932 - 13 January 1933)
Minister of Industry and Commerce:
Ion Lugoșianu (20 October 1932 - 13 January 1933)
Minister of Public Works and Communications:
Eduart Mirto (20 October 1932 - 13 January 1933)
Minister of Labour, Health, and Social Security:
D. R. Ioanițescu (20 October 1932 - 13 January 1933)

Ministers of State:
Pantelimon Halippa (20 October 1932 - 13 January 1933)
Teofil Sauciuc-Săveanu (20 October 1932 - 13 January 1933)
Gheorghe Crișan (20 October 1932 - 13 January 1933)

References

Cabinets of Romania
Cabinets established in 1932
Cabinets disestablished in 1933
1932 establishments in Romania
1933 disestablishments in Romania